Charles "Charly" Guiraist was a French sailor who competed in the 1900 Summer Olympics in Paris, France. Guiraist took the gold in the first race of the 3 to 10 ton and the silver medal in the second race of that class.

References

External links

 

French male sailors (sport)
Sailors at the 1900 Summer Olympics – 3 to 10 ton
Olympic sailors of France
Year of birth missing
Year of death missing

Olympic silver medalists for France
Olympic bronze medalists for France
Sailors at the 1900 Summer Olympics – Open class
Olympic medalists in sailing
Place of birth missing
Place of death missing